Marie (also known as Marie: A True Story) is a 1985 American biographical film starring Sissy Spacek as Marie Ragghianti, former head of the Tennessee Board of Pardons and Paroles, who was removed from office in 1977 after refusing to release prisoners on whose behalf bribes had been paid to aides to Governor Ray Blanton. Ragghianti, a single mother and political appointee, was hounded for refusal to cooperate with the culture of corruption with which she found herself confronted. Two of Blanton's aides faced prosecution for their roles in the scandal. The film was based on the book Marie: A True Story by Peter Maas.

The film was directed by Roger Donaldson, with a screenplay by John Briley, best known as the screenwriter of Gandhi.  It also starred Jeff Daniels, Keith Szarabajka, Morgan Freeman, Fred Thompson, Lisa Banes, John Cullum, Graham Beckel, and Macon McCalman.

Plot
It's the mid 1970s. Marie Ragghianti left an abusive marriage and moved back home with her mother Virginia in Tennessee to eke out a better life for herself and her three young children. She waited tables, while also completing the degree requirements at Vanderbilt to obtain a B.A. in English and Psychology. She is unapologetic in asking a college acquaintance, Eddie Sisk, for a job, when he is appointed legal counsel for the just-elected governor Ray Blanton. In what he considers a win-win situation, Eddie offers Marie a job as the Extradition Officer for the state, which she accepts. From there, Marie quickly moves up the chain of command, first becoming the liaison to the Governor on Parole Board recommendations - the role which is meant to be a two way street, where there is an understood quid pro quo in recommendations from the Board to the Governor, and from the Governor back to the Board - then becoming the Parole Board Chief. While working in these jobs, Marie becomes more and more uncomfortable in her working relationship with Eddie, and the Governor, who seems to be increasingly wanting parole for inmates who have no grounds to be paroled, and even worse, wanting full pardons for inmates who have no grounds to be pardoned. As Marie becomes more and more vocally opposed to what the Governor and Eddie want, she will learn how far they will go to silence and/or discredit her. In return, the Governor and Eddie will learn that Marie will not take what is happening to her sitting down, especially as she believes she has done nothing wrong in carrying out the responsibilities of any of her state duties.

Cast
 Sissy Spacek as Marie Ragghianti
 Jeff Daniels as Eddie Sisk
 Morgan Freeman as Charles Traughber
 Lisa Banes as Toni Greer 
 Keith Szarabajka as Kevin McCormack
 Trey Wilson as FBI Agent 
 Fred Thompson as Fred Thompson
 Don Hood as Governor Ray Blanton

Critical reception
Most reviewers praised Spacek's performance.  Janet Maslin, writing in The New York Times, said Spacek "...evolves effortlessly from a battered young wife to a self-possessed official, and gives yet another guileless, radiant performance of unusual immediacy." Several reviewers praised the performance of Fred Thompson, who was known primarily as a peripheral figure in the United States Senate probe of the Watergate scandal. Thompson was Ragghianti's attorney during the actual trial and played himself in the film.

References

External links 

 Review by Roger Ebert
 Review in The New York Times

1980s biographical films
1985 crime films
1985 films
Films based on non-fiction books
Films directed by Roger Donaldson
Films scored by Francis Lai
Films set in Tennessee
Films with screenplays by John Briley
Metro-Goldwyn-Mayer films
1980s English-language films
American biographical films
American films based on actual events
American crime films
Films about corruption in the United States
1980s American films